Joan Winifred Francis (9 September 1920 – 23 July 1961) was a New Zealand cricketer who played primarily as a right-arm medium bowler. She appeared in five Test matches for New Zealand between 1948 and 1954. She played domestic cricket for Wellington.

References

External links
 
 

1920 births
1961 deaths
Cricketers from Wellington City
New Zealand women cricketers
New Zealand women Test cricketers
Wellington Blaze cricketers